The Great Hip Hop Hoax is a documentary film by Jeanie Finlay about a Scottish hip-hop duo called Silibil N' Brains, who pretended to be Americans to secure a £250,000 record deal with Sony. The film premiered at South by Southwest and was later shown at the Edinburgh International Film Festival, before a national theatrical release in Scotland and broadcasts on BBC Two Scotland, BBC Four, and Danish station DR2. It was pitched at Sheffield Doc/Fest's MeetMarket in 2008.

Reception
The movie has received positive reviews. Both members of Silibil 'N Brains are reportedly happy with how the film turned out, though find it "bizarre" to watch with other people.

References

External links
www.hiphophoax.com The Great Hip-Hop Hoax official site

2013 documentary films
British documentary films
Documentary films about hip hop music and musicians
2013 films
Hoaxes in the United Kingdom
Musical hoaxes
2010s English-language films
2010s British films